François Godement (born June 14, 1949) is a French historian, specialist of China and international relations in East Asia. He is now a Professor in political science at Sciences Po and the Director for the strategy of Asia Centre, Paris.

Biography 
Professor of political science since 1992, François Godement has received teaching appointments at the University of California, at the National Institute of Oriental Languages and Civilizations (INALCO) until 2006, at the French Institute of International Relations (IFRI) from 1985 to 2005, and at Sciences Po, Paris.

François Godement is a graduate of the Ecole Normale Supérieure de la rue d'Ulm (Paris), he was a Harvard University postgraduate student, and he holds a Ph.D. in contemporary history. His research focuses on China’s foreign affairs, domestic factors of China’s strategic and international conceptions, compared politics in East Asia, integration process in Asia, security and international relations’ architecture in Asia.

He helped found the European Committee of the Council for Security Cooperation in the Asia-Pacific (CSCAP), which disappeared and was then replaced by the EU Committee, and is a co-founder of the Council for Asia-Europe Cooperation (CAEC). He has been a consultant to the Organisation for Economic Co-operation and Development (OECD), the European Union and the World Bank, and is an outside consultant to the Policy Planning staff of the French Ministry of Foreign Affairs. He is a Senior policy fellow of the European Council on Foreign Relations (ECFR). He founded Asia Centre in Paris in 2005, was its president until 2009 and then became its Strategy Director.

Asia Centre 
Asia Centre, established in August 2005 by Godement and a team of research fellows and experts on contemporary Asia, is an independent research institute which conducts discussions and produces publications on the strategic and economic aspects of international relations as well as current political and social transformations in the Asia-Pacific region.

Publications 
 Renaissance de l'Asie, Odile Jacob, 1993
 Communismes d'Asie , mort ou métamorphose ?, with Jean-Luc Domenach, Complexe, 1994
 Dragon de feu, dragon de papier, l'Asie a-t-elle un avenir ?, Flammarion, 1998
 Chine - États-Unis : méfiance et pragmatisme, La Documentation française, 2001

Notes and references

External links 
 Website of Asia Centre
 The Journal China Analysis
 Presentation of François Godement on the website of Sciences Po 

French political scientists
French sinologists
20th-century French historians
Academic staff of Sciences Po
Harvard Graduate School of Arts and Sciences alumni
École Normale Supérieure alumni
1949 births
Living people